The 1993 Dubai Duty Free Classic was a professional ranking snooker tournament that took place between 4 and 10 October 1993 at the Al Nasr Stadium in Dubai, United Arab Emirates.

Stephen Hendry won the tournament, defeating Steve Davis 9–3 in the final. The defending champion John Parrott was eliminated by Andy Hicks in the last 16 round.


Main draw

References

Dubai Classic
1993 in snooker
1993 in Emirati sport